Anestis Anastasiadis (Greek: Ανέστης Αναστασιάδης; born 21 January 1983) is a Greek professional football defender who plays for Atsalenios.

Career

AO Damasta
On 19 September 2019 it was confirmed, that 36-year-old Anastasiadis had joined AO Damasta.

References

External links
Profile at epae.org
http://www.aokerkyra.com/player.php?id=52&season=3

1983 births
Living people
Greek footballers
Association football defenders
Super League Greece players
FC Barcelona Atlètic players
Panetolikos F.C. players
PAS Lamia 1964 players
OFI Crete F.C. players
A.O. Kerkyra players
Ionikos F.C. players
Ethnikos Asteras F.C. players
AEL Kalloni F.C. players
Footballers from Ptolemaida